Can'tneverdidnothin' is the second studio album by Nikka Costa. The album was released May 24, 2005, by Virgin Records. It received generally favorable reviews from critics.

Track listing

2005 retail release

2004 promotional release

Personnel
Credits for Can'tneverdidnothin' adapted from Allmusic

?uestlove - drums ("Happy in the Morning")
Charlie Bisharat - violin
John Blackwell - drums ("Around the World")
Printz Board - horn ("Can'tneverdidnothin", "Funkier Than a Mosquita's Tweaker")
Jon Brion - organ ("I Gotta Know"), synthesizer ("Happy in the Morning")
Aillene Bullock - composer ("Funkier Than a Mosquita's Tweaker")
David Campbell - string arrangements ("I Gotta Know", "Around the World")
Dave Chegwidden - bongos, conga ("Fooled Ya Baby", "Funkier Than a Mosquita's Tweaker")
Larry Corbett - cello
Nikka Costa - audio production, composer, Fender Rhodes, keyboard, Korg synthesizer, piano, producer, tambourine, vocals
Shawn Davis - composer, bass, guitar (bass)
Joel Derouin - violin
Bruce Dukov - violin
Berj Garabedian - violin
Brian Gardner - mastering
Ranjit Grewal - photography
Chris Holmes - engineer ("I Gotta Know", "Around the World")

Stan "Chance" Howard - Moog bass, Moog synthesizer, organ
Lenny Kravitz - bass, drums, bass
Abe Laboriel, Jr. - drums
Felix Lau - assistant engineer
Brian LeBarton - clavinet, organ
Tim LeBlanc - engineer
Joshua "Trumpet Solo" Lopez - guitar, guitar (electric), shaker
Roger Joseph Manning, Jr. - clavinet
Manny Marroquin - mixing
Keith Megna - guitar, guitar (acoustic), guitar (electric), sitar
Wendy Melvoin - guitar (electric)
Adam Moseley - engineer, mixing
Tim Izo Orindgreff - horn, horn arrangements ("Can'tneverdidnothin", "Funkier Than a Mosquita's Tweaker")
Len Peltier - art direction, design
James Poyser - Moog synthesizer
Satnam Ramgotra - drums, turntables
Brian Reitzell - drums
Steven Rhodes - engineer
Craig Ross - composer, guitar, guitar (acoustic), guitar (electric)
Jim Scott - mixing
Sinisha - photography
Justin Stanley - audio production, bass, engineer, fuzz bass, guitar, guitar (bass), guitar (electric), kalimba, Mellotron, mixing, organ, percussion, producer

Singles
 "I Don't Think We've Met" (Promo only)
 "Till I Get to You" (Promo only)

Notes
"Till I Get to You", "Can'tneverdidnothin'", "Swing It Around", "Happy in the Morning", "I Gotta Know", and "Hey Love" are some of the tracks that were remixed and reorganized for the retail release.

References

2005 albums
Nikka Costa albums
Virgin Records albums
Albums produced by Justin Stanley